Victoria Mary Clarke (born 11 January 1966) is an Irish journalist and writer. She has written for various newspapers and magazines in Britain and Ireland.

Early life
Clarke grew up in the Irish countryside. Her mother was born in Herbert Park and became pregnant with Victoria at the age of nineteen. She was abandoned by her father when she was a young baby.

Career
Clarke is a music journalist who wrote for a number of newspapers and magazines.

She is the author of Angel in Disguise

Personal life
Clarke is also known for her long-term relationship with singer-songwriter Shane MacGowan, whom she met at sixteen, eight years his junior. She wrote the biography, A Drink with Shane MacGowan. They do not generally allow celebrities or journalists to frequent their house but Sinéad O'Connor has previously visited them.  After an 11-year engagement, they married in November 2018 in Copenhagen.

Like MacGowan, she is a fan of literature and music. She is also a yoga enthusiast. She believes in angels and claims to speak to them on a regular basis.

Popular culture
In 2007, she appeared on Celebrities Go Wild, an RTÉ reality television show in which eight celebrities had to fend for themselves in rural Connemara.

In December 2009, Clarke and McGowan appeared together on the RTÉ One reality television special Victoria and Shane Grow Their Own in which they attempted to tend to their own vegetables at an allotment in Dublin.

Clarke appeared on The Late Late Show with MacGowan on 26 February 2010 to discuss their single for the 2010 Haiti earthquake relief effort.

References

External links
 Official website
 Victoria and Shane Grow Their Own

Irish columnists
Irish women columnists
Irish women journalists
Sunday Independent (Ireland) people
The Guardian journalists
Irish gardeners
Participants in Irish reality television series
Living people
1966 births